Acrolophus doeri is a moth of the family Acrolophidae. It is found in Brazil.

References

Moths described in 1887
doeri